General Sir Crawford Trotter Chamberlain  (1821–1902) was a senior officer in the Indian Staff Corps.

Early life
Born in London on 9 May 1821, was the third son of Sir Henry Chamberlain, 1st Baronet by his second wife. Sir Neville Bowles Chamberlain was an elder brother. After education at private schools and under tutors Crawford obtained a cadetship in the Bengal army in 1837, and was posted to the 28th Bengal infantry. From this corps, he was transferred to the 16th Bengal infantry.

Afghan and Sikh Wars
With the outbreak of the First Anglo-Afghan War in 1839 Chamberlain's active service began. He was present at the siege of Ghazni (23 July 1839) and at the operations around Kandahar. In September 1841 he was appointed to the command of the 5th Janbaz cavalry, and in the following month, he became adjutant of Christie's horse. Until the end of the Afghan campaign, he was engaged in constant heavy fighting.

In 1843 Chamberlain was sent to Scinde with two squadrons of Christie's horse as an independent command, to be known as Chamberlain's horse. In 1845 he was invalided to the Cape of Good Hope, where he married. Next year he returned to India as second in command of the 9th irregular cavalry, into which his own corps had been absorbed. During the First Anglo-Sikh War and the Second Anglo-Sikh War he was constantly in action. He was at the battle of Chillian walla on 13 January 1849, receiving the medal and clasp. On 30 January he was again engaged in the neighbourhood; here he was wounded and was made the subject of a special despatch by Lord Gough (31 January). At the Battle of Gujrat on 21 February, he had to be lifted into the saddle, where he remained throughout the day. He was awarded the clasp, was mentioned in despatches, and, being promoted to captain and brevet major in November 1849, was given the command of the 1st irregular cavalry, formerly Skinner's Horse. He served with them in the Mohmand expedition of 1854 and received a medal and clasp.

Indian Rebellion of 1857
On the outbreak of the Indian Rebellion, Chamberlain's men volunteered to shoot condemned rebels at Jullundur (4 June 1857). He was given the duty of disarming the 62nd and 69th regiments at Multan. At Chichawatni (September) Chamberlain was attacked by a superior force of the enemy, and housed his cavalry in a caravanserai. He held out until he was relieved three days later.

For his services, Chamberlain was promoted to lieutenant-colonel. In April 1862 he was made colonel.

Later life
In 1864 Chamberlain was appointed honorary A.D.C. to the governor-general, and two years later was made Companion of the Order of the Star of India (CSI), and was included in the first list of twelve officers for good service pension. In 1866, too, he was transferred to the command of the central Indian horse, and next year to the command of the Gwalior district with the rank of brigadier-general.

In 1869 Chamberlain was officiating political agent at Gwalior; from October 1869 to February 1870 he was acting political agent at the court of Scindia until his promotion to major-general. During his unemployed time as major-general he served on various commissions and courts of inquiry, and from 1874 to 1879 he commanded the Oudh division. He became lieutenant-general in October 1877 and general in January 1880.

In 1880 Chamberlain returned to England for the first time since 1837. In 1884 he was retired from the active list. In 1897, on the occasion of Queen Victoria's diamond jubilee, he was made Knight Grand Commander of the Order of the Indian Empire (GCIE).

He died at his residence, Lordswood, Southampton, on 13 December 1902, and was buried at Rownhams.

Family
Chamberlain married twice:

 in 1845, at the Cape, to Elizabeth de Witt, daughter of J. de Witt; she died on 19 January 1894; and
 in 1896 to Augusta Margaret Christie, daughter of Major-General John Christie, C.B., who survived him.

There was no issue by either marriage.

Notes

External links
britishmedals.us, General Crawford Trotter Chamberlain, partly based on DNB text.

Attribution

Knights Grand Commander of the Order of the Indian Empire
Companions of the Order of the Star of India
British military personnel of the Indian Rebellion of 1857
British military personnel of the First Anglo-Afghan War
British military personnel of the Second Anglo-Sikh War
1821 births
1902 deaths
British Indian Army generals
Indian Staff Corps officers
Younger sons of baronets